Kilmarnock FC Women is a women's football team based in Kilmarnock, Ayrshire that plays in the SWPL 2. Founded as Stewarton Thistle, the club is the oldest women's football team in Scotland and celebrated its 50th anniversary in July 2011.

History

Stewarton Thistle
Local historian Alastair Barclay wrote in 1973 that a girls' soccer team was founded in Stewarton 12 years previously "more or less for laughs" but had quickly eclipsed the modest achievements of the town's male teams.

Sue Lopez recorded in her Women on the Ball book (1997) that the club was formed in 1961 at the Lord Provost's request, to raise money for the Freedom from Hunger campaign. The club enjoyed local success and, with star player Rose Reilly, reached the final of the first ever Women's FA Cup in 1971. Played under the auspices of the English Women's Football Association, the competition admitted Scottish and Welsh teams in its early years. Stewarton Thistle lost 4–1 to Lopez's Southampton at Crystal Palace National Sports Centre. A few months later, however, Thistle did manage to defeat Southampton in the final of the Deal International Tournament, which featured teams from across Europe. In the same year, Stewarton Thistle won the inaugural edition of the Scottish Women's Cup, winning 4-2 over Aberdeen Prima Donnas in the final.

In 1972 they reached the Women's FA Cup final again, playing under the name of Lee's Ladies due to a naming–rights sponsorship deal. Southampton beat them again, 3–2 at Eton Park in Burton upon Trent.

Kilmarnock
In 1999 the club became known as Kilmarnock. The early part of the 2000s saw manager Jim Chapman assemble a strong squad with several Scotland women's national football team players. The club won the league championship twice and was Scotland's representative in the UEFA Women's Cup in 2002–03 and 2003–04.

Later in the decade Kilmarnock were much less successful, with a young and inexperienced side who often suffered heavy defeats. May 2010 saw a 29–0 loss at champions Glasgow City. In 2011 they finished last in the Scottish Women's Premier League but were spared relegation because of a shortage of teams. The team's only win of the season, 2–0 against Falkirk, was changed to a 3–0 defeat when it emerged one of Kilmarnock's players was six weeks short of her 15th birthday and ineligible for senior football. However, in the 2012 season, they finished bottom again and they were relegated.

In 2017, former Kilmarnock player Shelley Kerr became the Scotland Women's national coach.

In the 2018 SWPL season, newly promoted Kilmarnock lost their first league match of the season at home against Motherwell 2-1. After the match Kilmarnock complained that Motherwell had not followed correct SWF procedures. Kilmarnock were subsequently rewarded with a 3-0 win over Motherwell. The result put them top of the SWPL2.

In January 2020, F.C. Kilmarnock Ladies was brought in house and under full control by Kilmarnock F.C. before being renamed and re-branded as Kilmarnock FC Women with former Rangers coach Andy Gardner being appointed as the team's new head coach ahead of the 2020 season.

In July 2022, Kilmarnock Women's playing squad signed their first ever professional contracts in a landmark move for the club. Former head coach Jim Chapman would also make a return for a second spell in charge ahead of the team's move into the newly formed Scottish Women's Premier League.

First team squad

Former players
For details of former players, see :Category:F.C. Kilmarnock Ladies players.

Honours

 Scottish League Championship
 Winners (3): 1970–71, 2001–02, 2002–03
 Runners-up (1): 2004–05
 Scottish Women's Premier League 2
 Runners-up (1): 2018
 Scottish Women's First Division South
 Winners (1): 2017
 FA Cup
 Runners-up (2): 1970–71, 1971–72
Scottish Cup
 Winners (3): 1971, 2000–01, 2001–02
 Runners-up (1): 2002–03
Scottish Premier League Cup
 Winners (3): 2002–03, 2003–04, 2005–06
Scottish League Cup (top League Cup competition prior to Premier League Cup)
 Winners (1): 2001–02

References

Bibliography

External links
Soccerway

Women's football clubs in Scotland
Ladies
Association football clubs established in 1961
Sport in Kilmarnock
1961 establishments in Scotland
Scottish Women's Premier League clubs
Scottish Women's Football League clubs
Football in East Ayrshire